Bourbon is an unincorporated community in Douglas County, Illinois, United States.

References

Unincorporated communities in Douglas County, Illinois
Unincorporated communities in Illinois